Roberto Olabe may refer to:

Roberto Olabe (footballer, born 1967), Spanish former football goalkeeper and manager
Roberto Olabe (footballer, born 1996), Spanish professional footballer, son of the above